The Sydney–Melbourne rail corridor is an approximately  standard gauge railway corridor that runs between Melbourne (Victoria) and Sydney (New South Wales), the two largest cities in Australia. Freight and passenger services operate along the route, such as the NSW TrainLink XPT passenger service. The XPT offers a day and night service in each direction.

The railway corridor consists of NSW's Main Southern railway line from Sydney's Central Station to Albury Station –  – together with Victoria's North East railway line –  – from Albury station to Melbourne's Southern Cross station (via Tottenham).

History 

In 1883, the Victorian Railways broad gauge line met the New South Wales Government Railways standard gauge line at Albury at a break-of-gauge. The two tracks were separated by a long island platform.

It was not until 1962, with the opening of the North East standard gauge line in Victoria, that through services were possible between Melbourne and Sydney.

The corridor was once home to intercapital passenger services such as the Spirit of Progress, Southern Aurora, and  Intercapital Daylight.

Current passenger services 

The XPT service runs two return trips each day between Melbourne and Sydney, making scheduled stops at Broadmeadows, Seymour, Benalla, Wangaratta, Albury, Wagga Wagga, Junee, Cootamundra, Yass Junction, Goulburn, Moss Vale, Campbelltown and Central with optional stops at Culcairn, Henty, The Rock, Harden and Gunning. The stops at Broadmeadows and Seymour were introduced on Sunday 25 November 2012. Prior to this date, the XPT ran express from Melbourne to Benalla.

Of the four daily XPT services (two in each direction), all take about 11 hours.

Infrastructure shortcomings and upgrades
A huge disparity in investment between rail and road has existed since World War II. Relatively high road speeds are possible because the highway now bypasses many of the towns where there were speed limits. Further, in 2013 the entire Hume Highway was completed as a dual carriageway, whereas the rail line is still single-track in some places – a crucial impediment to continuous running.

Sections of the line in NSW are signalled for a top speed of  due to curves with small radii (some are ) and steep gradients (some are 1:38 or 2.6% adjusted for curvature).

Freight trains struggle to maintain this speed in places. The number of curves along the entire route have been calculated to be equivalent to rotating the train by 72 circles (36 circles to the right and 36 circles to the left).

There is a double crossover  further north, another one before Benalla, another before Wangaratta and another at Wodonga West. A  double track northern bypass of Wodonga has been constructed. The single track resumes just south of the Murray River and Albury.

A number of passing loops of about  length each have also been added between Junee and Albury and between Seymour and Craigieburn. As well, some broad gauge track between Jacana and Albion has been made dual gauge to facilitate a new passing loop.

The four new passing lanes in Victoria are: i) Albion–Jacana ii) Donnybrook iii) Kilmore East iv) Tallarook.

The five new passing lanes in NSW are: i) Gerogery ii) Culcairn iii) Yerong Creek iv) Uranquinty v) Bomen.

The above changes, along with full concrete sleepering of the line and many signalling upgrades should be completed by mid-2012.

More recently old  rail is being replaced between Melbourne and Albury with new .

Mudholes have appeared in numerous sections of track since the concrete re-sleepering. These cause rough riding which can cause damage to rolling stock, and has occasionally led to trains separating. It is a matter of controversy whether the method employed to do the re-sleepering has caused the problem, or if it is merely the result of wet weather. Speed restrictions have been placed on the affected track while work is done to enhance the drainage of water from the track and fresh ballast is applied.

As passenger trains get priority over freight trains, a freight-only track known as the Southern Sydney Freight Line was added in Sydney in 2012. This single track line (with two crossing loops) allows freight trains to travel in and out of the freight terminals during passenger peak times.

Some works have also been made in Melbourne to improve the flow of freight trains into the port.

A rail overpass has been constructed which connects the Standard Gauge line near Sunshine with the Standard Gauge line near Brooklyn. This allows trains to travel north–south (Brisbane–Sydney–Melbourne) and east–west (Melbourne–Adelaide) rail corridors without having to change direction at Tottenham. This additional track completes a Standard Gauge Sunshine–Brooklyn–Tottenham rail triangle. This track was commissioned mid-2010.

High-speed rail

Based on the definition of a minimum top speed of 200 km/h in passenger service, High-speed rail in Australia does not yet exist, but there are proposals for high-speed rail (HSR) infrastructure in Australia (also known as very fast train projects) – several proposals have been investigated since the early 1980s.

Various combinations of the route between Melbourne, Canberra, Goulburn, Sydney, Newcastle, Coffs Harbour, Gold Coast and Brisbane have been the subject of detailed investigation by prospective operators, government departments and advocacy groups.

Phase 1 of the A$20m HSR study was released on 4 August 2011. It proposed a corridor similar to the 2001 study, with prospective stations located in Melbourne, Tullamarine, Albury, Canberra, Goulburn, Sydney, Newcastle, the Mid—North Coast, Gold Coast and Brisbane. The cost for this route was estimated at A$61 billion, but the adoption of more difficult alignments or cost blowouts could raise the cost to over A$100 billion. The report urged the authorities to acquire land on the corridor now to avoid further price escalations.

Work on phase 2 of the study started in late 2011 and culminated in the release of the High speed rail study phase 2 report on 11 April 2013. Building on the work of phase 1, it was more comprehensive in objectives and scope, and refined many of the phase 1 estimates, particularly demand and cost estimates.

Improvement proposals
Dr Philip Laird OAM, Honorary Associate Professor at Wollongong University, proposes that the Sydney to Melbourne train journey could be significantly reduced in time and cost if sections of the track were upgraded for medium-speed rail. Laird presented his proposal at the Ausrail annual conference, December 2022, stating that while a high-speed rail line would take decades to build, upgrading 200 km of track to replace an existing 250 km stretch of steam-age railway would result in a quicker service within four years. This proposal would also require the construction of three major track deviations in New South Wales. The use of tilting trains, which can travel through curved sections of track at higher speeds, would allow for travel speeds of up to 170 km/h and reduce the journey time between Sydney and Melbourne to approximately six hours. Laird estimates that his plan would cost "in the billions of dollars, not tens of billions" required for high-speed rail projects.

Less ambitious proposals have included a minor  Jindalee Deviation mentioned in a 2006 Ernst and Young Report. Naturally, a slow evolution consisting of many short deviations that can provide benefits sooner will not be equivalent to a few large deviations that could provide bigger bypasses and greater benefit. However, more ambitious proposals come with greater risk of projects being delayed or cancelled.

Over the years a number of deviations have been proposed for the track between Junee and Sydney, including between Glenlee and Aylmerton (known as the Wentworth Deviation), Werai and Penrose, Goulburn and Yass (Centennial Deviation), Bowning and Frampton including a bypass of Cootamundra (Hoare Deviation), and Frampton and Bethungra (removal of the Bethungra Spiral). However the Australian Rail Track Corporation have only documented plans for a handful of minor deviations to be completed by 2014.

Notes

References

Bibliography 

Standard gauge railways in Australia
Rail infrastructure in Australia
Railway lines in New South Wales
Railway lines in Victoria (Australia)
Interstate rail in Australia
Public transport routes in the City of Melbourne (LGA)
Transport in the City of Hume